Waltz is one of the five dances in the Standard (or Modern) category of the International Style ballroom dances. It was previously referred to as slow waltz or English waltz.

Waltz is usually the first dance in the dancesport competition rounds.  It is danced exclusively in the closed position, unlike its American Style counterpart.

History

The Waltz originated as a folk dance from Austria. Predecessors include the matenick and a variation called the furiant that were performed during rural festivals in Bohemia. The French dance, "Walt", and the Austrian Ländler are the most similar to the waltz among its predecessors.

The "king of dances" acquired different national traits in different countries. Thus there appeared the English waltz, the Hungarian waltz, and the waltz-mazurka.  The word "waltz" is derived from the old German word "walzen" meaning "to roll, turn", or "to glide".  Waltz has been danced competitively since 1923 or 1924.

Music

International Standard Waltz is a waltz dance and danced to slow waltz music, preferably 28 to 30 bars per minute (84 to 90 beats per minute). Waltz music is in 3/4 time and the first beat of a measure is strongly accented.

Character

Like all Standard category dances, waltz is a progressive dance, meaning that dancers travel along a path known as the line of dance, that is counter-clockwise around the floor. It is characterized by pendulum swing movements and incorporates general elements of ballroom technique such as foot parallelism, rise and fall, contra body movement and sway.

Figures can have one step per beat (three per measure) but also four, five or six steps per measure. The faster pace of the latter, especially when combined with dance turns, results in fast-paced, dynamic dancing despite the relatively slow music tempo. Slow steps and elegant poses are often used to contrast fast-paced dance segments, resulting in what is sometimes referred to as light and shade.

Syllabus

This is the Imperial Society of Teachers of Dancing (ISTD) International Standard syllabus.

Pre-Bronze

Note that Pre-Bronze is included as part of the Bronze syllabus.

Closed changes
Natural turn
Reverse turn
Natural spin turn
Whisk
Chassé from promenade position

Bronze

Silver

     xx.  Drag hesitation

Gold

     xx.  Fallaway whisk

See also
 Viennese waltz
 Foxtrot
 Boston (dance)
 Waltz

References

External links
 — championship level waltz.

Ballroom dance
Waltz
Triple time dances